Alexander Duncan may refer to:

Alexander Duncan (army officer) (1780–1859), East India Company officer
Alexander Duncan (athlete) (1884–1959), British Olympic runner
Alexander Duncan (bishop) (1655–1733), Scottish Episcopal clergyman and bishop
Alexander Duncan (politician) (1788–1853), U.S. Representative from Ohio
Alexander Duncan (police officer) (1888–1965), Scottish police officer and Chief Commissioner of Victoria Police (Australia), 1937–1954
Alex Duncan (1900–1984), former Australian rules footballer
Alexander Duncan (doctor), British doctor who spent six years in a village high up in the Wakhan Corridor of north-eastern Afghanistan
Alexander William Duncan (1881–1934), Scottish cricketer and rugby player
Alexander Duncan (footballer) (1891–?), Scottish footballer

See also